Julien Bertheau (19 June 1910 – 28 October 1995) was a French actor.

Biography 
Born in Algiers, Algeria, before making his debut at the Comédie-Française on 18 December 1936, he worked as manager of the Theatre de la Porte Saint-Martin, then he studied with Charles Dullin at the Atelier Theatre, appeared in plays at the Comédie des Champs-Elysées and finally worked with Louis Jouvet.
He left the Comédie-French after twenty-two years.

In 1961, he starred in Madame Sans-Gene opposite Sophia Loren.
Bertheau was one of the favorite actors of Luis Buñuel, appearing in his Cela s'appelle l'aurore (1955), playing a maitre d'hotel in La Voie lactée (1969), a bishop in Le Charme discret de la bourgeoisie (1972) and a policeman in Le Fantôme de la liberté (1974).

Bertheau died in Nice in 1995. His son, Alain Bertheau, was also a notable stage actor.

Comédie-Française 

 Fortunio, Le Chandelier, Alfred de Musset, with Gaston Baty, 18 December 1936 (debut)
 Clitandre, Le Misanthrope, Molière, 1° January 1937
 Lord Kingston, Chatterton,, Alfred de Vigny, 7 & 14 January 1937 = 2 fois
 Éraste, Le Dépit amoureux, Molière, 15 January 1937
 Cléante, Le Malade imaginaire, Molière, 15 January 1937
 Le jeune malade, Le Jeune Malade, André Chénier, 23 January 1937, matinée poétique
 Damis, Tartuffe, Molière, 1° March 1937
 Mario, Le Jeu de l'amour et du hasard, Marivaux, 2 March 1937
 Henri, Le Peintre exigeant, Tristan Bernard, 15 March 1937
 Vinaigre, Madame Sans Gêne, Victorien Sardou & Émile Moreau, 1° April 1937
 Silvio, À quoi rêvent les jeunes filles ?, Alfred de Musset, 5 April 1937
 Gaston, Les Corbeaux, Henry Becque, 21 April 1937
 Un nécessaire, L’Impromptu de Versailles, Molière, 24 May 1937
 Le receveur, Le Simoun, Henri-René Lenormand, with Gaston Baty, 22 June 1937, première
 Augustin Fontanet, Le Vieil Homme, Georges de Porto-Riche, 1° September 1937
 Léandre, Les Fourberies de Scapin, Molière, 9 September 1937
 Britannicus, Britannicus, Racine, 23 September 1937 – 1942 = 11 fois
 Un maître de danse, Il ne faut jurer de rien, Alfred de Musset, nouvelle présentation, 5 October 1937
 Filinte, Les Fâcheux, Molière, 4 November 1937
 Lucidor, L'Épreuve, Marivaux, 19 November 1937; reprise 8 April 1948
 Cléante, L’Avare, Molière, 29 November 1937 – 27 September 1945
 Vicomte de Saussy, La Marche nuptiale, Henry Bataille, 6 December 1937
 Arlequin, Arlequin poli par l'amour, Marivaux, 16 December 1937
 Pierrot II, Les Deux Pierrot, Edmond Rostand, 18 December 1937
 Horace, L’École des femwith, Molière, 30 December 1937
 André Pain, La Brouille, Charles Vildrac, 18 January 1938
 Julien Cicandel, L’anglais tel qu’on le parle, Tristan Bernard, 27 January 1938
 Le Lieutenant de gendarmerie, La Robe rouge, Eugène Brieux, 1 °February 1938
 Saint-Marchan, Madame Sans Gêne, Victorien Sardou & Émile Moreau, 4 February 1938
 Don Mathias, Hernani, Victor Hugo, 10 February 1938
 Lubin, Les Fausses Confidences, Marivaux, with Pierre Dux, 20 February 1938
 d’Orbel, Le Veuf, Carmontelle, 24 February 1938 – 1956
 Dautier, Un ami de jeunesse, Edmond Sée, 24 March 1938
 Armand, La Navette, Henry Becque, 29 March 1938
 Azor, La Dispute, Marivaux, with Jean Martinelli, 25 April 1938
 le fils, L'Âge ingrat, Jean Desbordes, 25 April 1938
 Le comte d’Albe, Ruy Blas, Victor Hugo, with Pierre Dux, 23 May 1938
 Leroy, Madame Sans Gêne, Victorien Sardou & Émile Moreau, 30 July 1938
 Montazgo, Ruy Blas, Victor Hugo, with Pierre Dux, 1938; reprise 7 December 1944
 Thomas Diafoirus, Le Malade imaginaire, Molière, 19 September 1938
 le Ramoneur, Tricolore, Pierre Lestringuez, with Louis Jouvet, 13 October 1938
 Arlequin, La Surprise de l'amour, Marivaux, 21 November 1938
 de Valvert, Cyrano de Bergerac, Edmond Rostand, with Pierre Dux, 19 December 1938
 d'Arques, Les Trois Henry, André Lang, 21 March 1939
 Farizet, L'Indiscret, Edmond Sée, 17 April 1939
 Judas, A souffert sous Ponce-Pilate, Paul Raynal, with René Alexandre, 26 April 1939; reprise 9 March 1947
 l'appelé des jeunes classes, L'Offrande, Gaston Sorbets, 3 June 1939
 Le Poète, La Nuit d'October, Alfred de Musset, 7 November 1940
 Valentin, La Nuit des Rois ou ce que vous voudrez, William Shakespeare, with Jacques Copeau, 23 December 1940
 Léandre, Le Médecin malgré lui, Molière, 23 January 1941
 Jeppo Liveretto, Lucrèce Borgia, Victor Hugo, 1er March 1941
 Le poète, La Nuit de May, Alfred de Musset, 17 March 1941
 Sem, Noé, André Obey, 31 March 1941
 Damien, André del Sarto, Alfred de Musset, with Jean Debucourt, 19 May 1941
 La Grange, Les Précieuses ridicules, Molière, 23 May 1941
 Antonio, Le Chant du Berceau, Gregorio & Martinez Sierra, 25 May 1941
 Fantasio, Fantasio, Alfred de Musset, with Pierre Bertin, puis 11 July 1941
 un jeune homme, Madame Quinze, Jean Sarment, 17 July 1941
 Valère, Le Médecin volant, Molière, with Fernand Ledoux, 29 October 1941
 Horatio, Hamlet, William Shakespeare/Guy de Pourtalès, with Charles Granval, 16 March 1942
 Annibal Desiderio, Les Marrons du feu, Alfred de Musset, with Jean Martinelli, 27 April 1942
 Montmeyran, Le Gendre de Monsieur Poirier, Émile Augier & Jules Sandeau, 4 July 1942
 Don Pedro, La Reine morte, Henry de Montherlant, with Pierre Dux, 8 December 1942
 André, Boubouroche, Georges Courteline, 19 May 1943
 Gringoire, Gringoire, Théodore de Banville, 12 September 1943*
 le chinois, The Satin Slipper, Paul Claudel, with Jean-Louis Barrault, 27 November 1943
 Monsieur Robert, La Poudre aux yeux, Eugène Labiche, with Jean Meyer, 24 February 1944
 Tertius Doctor, cérémonie du Le Malade imaginaire, Molière, with Jean Meyer, 28 October 1944
 Molière, L’Impromptu de Versailles, Molière, with Pierre Dux, 28 October 1944
 Ulric, Barberine, Alfred de Musset, with Jean Meyer, 10 December 1944
 Guy Duval-Lavallée, Les Fiancés du Havre, Armand Salacrou, with Pierre Dux, 16 December 1944; reprise (Salle Luxembourg) 21 November 1946
 Dorante, Le Légataire universel, Régnard, with Pierre Dux, 24 February 1945
 Alain, Les Mal-aimés, François Mauriac, with Jean-Louis Barrault, 1° March 1945
 Philon, Antoine et Cléopâtre, William Shakespeare/André Gide, with Jean-Louis Barrault, 30 April 1945
 Ventidius, Antoine et Cléopâtre, William Shakespeare/André Gide, with Jean-Louis Barrault, 30 April 1945
 Scarus, Antoine et Cléopâtre, William Shakespeare/André Gide, with Jean-Louis Barrault, 30 April 1945
 Daniel Savary, Le Voyage de monsieur Perrichon, Eugène Labiche and Édouard Martin, with Jean Meyer, 31 January 1946
 Joseph, Feu la mère de madame, Georges Feydeau, 16 February 1946
 Narcisse, Britannicus, Racine, reprise with Jean Marais, 4 March 1946 – 19 September 1954 = 84 fois
 Dorante, Le Jeu de l'amour et du hasard, Marivaux, 17 October 1946
 Sanine, Le Tourbillon, Bernard Zimmer, with Jean Meyer, Salle Luxembourg, 11 December 1946
 Perdican, On ne badine pas avec l'amour, Alfred de Musset, 11 January 1947
 Néron, Britannicus, Racine, 29 January au 9 December 1947 5 fois
 Le Chevalier, Les Sourires inutiles, Marcel Achard 4 February 1947
 Georges, La Brebis, Edmond Sée, 2 July 1947
 Chatterton, Chatterton, Alfred de Vigny, 30 October 1947 – 25 January 1948 = 15 fois
 Lorenzo, La Peine capitale, Claude-André Puget, Salle Luxembourg, 3 March 1948
 Tulle, Horace, Pierre Corneille, with Jean Debucourt, 8 April 1948
 Le cardeur de laine, La Peine capitale, Claude-André Puget, Salle Luxembourg, 3 October 1948
 Bob Laroche, Les Temps difficiles, Édouard Bourdet, with Pierre Dux, 22 December 1948
 Maurice, Le Plaisir de rompre, Jules Renard, 25 June 1949
 Alvar Gonçalvès, La Reine morte, Henry de Montherlant, with Pierre Dux, 15 November 1949
 Don Juan, L'Homme de cendres, André Obey, with Pierre Dux, 22 December 1949, au Théâtre de l'Odéon
 Valère, Le Médecin malgré lui, Molière, Le Caire, 18 March 1950
 Le prince, La Double inconstance, Marivaux, with Jacques Charon, 19 September 1950
 Frédéri, L’Arlésienne, Alphonse Daudet, 23 December 1950
 Le Visiteur, Un voisin sait tout, Gérard Bauër, 11 March 1951
 Lambert Laudisi, Chacun sa vérité, Luigi Pirandello, d'après Charles Dullin, 14 March 1951
 le Temps, Un conte d'hiver, William Shakespeare/Claude-André Puget, 18 March 1951
 Lui, L'Homme que j'ai tué, Maurice Rostand, 30 May 1951
 le Chœur, Antigone, Sophocles/, 19 June 1951
 Le petit brun, Donogoo, Jules RoMayns, with Jean Meyer, 9 November 1951
 Grussgott, Le Veau gras, Bernard Zimmer, 16 November 1951
 Un officier du palais, Œdipe roi, Sophocle/Thierry Maulnier, 14 May 1952
 Le cardinal, La Peine capitale, Claude-André Puget, 12 June 1952
 Mercutio, Roméo et Juliette, William Shakespeare/Jean Sarment, 22 October 1952
 Jacques, Comme il vous plaira, William Shakespeare/Jules Supervielle, with Jacques Charon, 1951–52
 Le poète, La Nuit d’October, Alfred de Musset, 1951–52
 Le Chœur, Pasiphaé, Henry de Montherlant, 25 February 1953
 Ulysse, Une Fille pour du vent, André Obey, 15 April 1953
 Ulric, Les Noces de deuil, Philippe Hériat, 15 October 1953
 Octave, Les Caprices de Marianne, Alfred de Musset, 9 December 1953
 le prologue, Prométhée enchaîné, Eschyle/Jean de Beer, Festival de Lyon Charbonnières, 18 au 21 June 1954
 Trielle, La Paix chez soi, Georges Courteline, 18 September 1954
 Charles, Le Pavillon des enfants, Jean Sarment, 24 May 1955
 Le Comte Almaviva, Le Mariage de Figaro, Beaumarchais, with Jean Meyer, 14 February 1957
 Acaste, Polydora, André Gillois, 7 March 1957

Director 

1943: La Légende du Chevalier (by André de Peretti Della Roca)
1945: Le Pèlerin (by Charles Vildrac)
1946: Britannicus (by Racine)
1947: On ne badine pas avec l'amour (by Alfred de Musset)
1948: La Peine capitale (by Claude-André Puget)
1950: The Winter's Tale (by William Shakespeare)
1950: L'Arlésienne (by Alphonse Daudet)
1951: Chacun sa vérité (by Luigi Pirandello, mise en scène d'après Charles Dullin)
1951: L'Homme que j'ai tué (by Maurice Rostand)
1951: Le Veau gras (by Bernard Zimmer)
1952: Six personnages en quête d'auteur (by Luigi Pirandello)
1952: Romeo and Juliet (by William Shakespeare)
1952: Oedipus Rex (by Sophocles)
1952: Le Cid (by Pierre Corneille)
1953: Bérénice (by Racine, Théâtre des Célestins)
1953: Pasiphaé (by Henry de Montherlant)
1953: Une fille pour du vent (by André Obey)
1953: Les Noces de deuil (by Philippe Hériat)
1954: En attendant l'aurore (by Madame Simone)
1954: Fantasio (by Alfred de Musset)
1955: Le Pavillon des enfants (by Jean Sarment)
1955: L’Annonce faite à Marie (by Paul Claudel)

Outside Comédie-Française

Actor 

1928: Le Carnaval de l'amour (by Charles Méré, mise en scène Émile Couvelaine, Théâtre de la Porte Saint-Martin)
1930: Patchouli (by Armand Salacrou, mise en scène Charles Dullin, Théâtre de l'Atelier)
1931: Atlas-Hôtel (by Armand Salacrou, mise en scène Charles Dullin, Théâtre de l'Atelier)
1931: La Prochaine ? (by André-Paul Antoine, Théâtre Antoine)
1934: Les Races (by Ferdinand Bruckner, mise en scène Raymond Rouleau, Théâtre de l'Œuvre)
1934: Un roi, deux dames et un valet (by François Porche, Comédie des Champs-Elysées)
1935: Noix de coco (by Marcel Achard, mise en scène Raimu, Théâtre de Paris)
1935: Les Retours imprévus (by Edmond Sée)
1936: L'École des femmes (by Molière, mise en scène Louis Jouvet, Théâtre de l'Athénée)
1948: Jardin français (dialogues by Albert Husson, mise en scène Julien Bertheau, Théâtre des Célestins)
1959: Tête d'or (by Paul Claudel, mise en scène Jean-Louis Barrault, Odéon-Théâtre de France)
1961: Antigone (by Jean Anouilh, mise en scène André Barsacq, Vienne)
1961: L'Impromptu des collines (by Albert Husson, mise en scène Julien Bertheau, Théâtre du Tertre, Théâtre des Célestins)
1961: Claude de Lyon (by Albert Husson, mise en scène Julien Bertheau, Théâtre du Tertre, Théâtre des Célestins)
1963: Le Neveu de Rameau (by Denis Diderot, mise en scène Jacques-Henri Duval, Théâtre de l'Œuvre, Théâtre de la Michodière)
1966: L'Idée fixe (by Paul Valéry, mise en scène Pierre Franck, Théâtre de la Michodière)
1969: La Tour d'Einstein (by Christian Liger, mise en scène avec Pierre Fresnay, Théâtre royal du Parc, Théâtre de la Michodière)
1970: L'Idée fixe (de Paul Valéry, mise en scène Pierre Franck, Théâtre de la Michodière)
1971: Mon Faust (by Paul Valéry, mise en scène Pierre Franck, Théâtre de la Michodière)
1975: Othon (by Corneille, mise en scène Jean-Pierre Miquel, Théâtre national de l'Odéon)
1975: Les Secrets de la Comédie humaine (by Félicien Marceau, mise en scène Paul-Emile Deiber, Théâtre du Palais Royal)
1981: Le Neveu de Rameau (by Denis Diderot, mise en scène Jacques-Henri Duval, Petit Odéon)

Director 

1945: Rouge et or (by Charles de Peyret-Chappuis, Théâtre La Bruyère)
1945: Judith (by Charles de Peyret-Chappuis, Théâtre Hébertot)
1946: La Putain respectueuse (by Jean-Paul Sartre, Théâtre Antoine)
1947: La Parisienne (by Henry Becque, Théâtre des Mathurins)
1948: Jardin français (dialogues by Albert Husson, Théâtre des Célestins)
1957: Le Cœur volant (by Claude-André Puget, Théâtre Antoine)
1961: Claude de Lyon (by Albert Husson, Théâtre du Tertre)
1961: L'Impromptu des collines (by Albert Husson, Théâtre du Tertre)
1963: Cinna (by Pierre Corneille, Théâtre de l'Ambigu)
1964: Anthony and Cleopatra (by William Shakespeare, Festival de Carthage)
1964: les Mal aimés de François Mauriac, mise en scène Julien Bertheau avec Jacques Dumesnil, assistant charles Tordjman: Théâtre de Lille.
1971: Dumas le magnifique (by Alain Decaux, Théâtre du Palais Royal)
1977: Hamlet (by William Shakespeare, Théâtre des Célestins)

Filmography

Film 

1929: The Crime of Sylvestre Bonnard (de André Berthomieu)
1930: Little Lise (de Jean Grémillon) - André
1932: Barranco, Ltd (de André Berthomieu) - Gérard Fortiolis
1935: Pasteur (de Sacha Guitry) - Un élève (uncredited)
1936: La vie est à nous (de Jean Renoir, Jacques Becker, Jean-Paul Le Chanois et André Zwoboda) - René - l'ouvrier en chômage / The unemployed
1942: La Symphonie fantastique de Christian-Jaque) - Victor Hugo (uncredited)
1942: Etoiles de demain (Short, de René Guy-Grand) - Narrator (voice)
1942: Hommage à Georges Bizet (Short, de Louis Cuny)
1943: La Cavalcade des heures (de Yvan Noé) - Récitant (voice)
1943: Un seul amour (de Pierre Blanchar) - James de Poulay
1943: The White Waltz (de Jean Stelli) - Bernard Lampré
1944: Carmen (de Christian-Jaque) - Lucas, le matador / Lucas, il matador
1946: Raboliot (de Jacques Daroy) - Pierre Fouques dit Raboliot
1946: Patrie (de Louis Daquin) - Le prince Guillaume d'Orange
1946: Comédie avant Molière (Short, de Jean Tedesco)
1950: La montagne est verte (Short, de Jean Lehérissey) - Commentator (voice)
1951:  (de Jean Stelli) - Lorenzi
1953: Bernard de Clairvaux (Short, de Pierre Zimmer) - Récitant / Narrator (voice)
1954: La Commune (Documentary Short, de Robert Ménégoz) - L'empereur Napoléon I
1954: Le Comte de Monte-Cristo (de Robert Vernay) - L'empereur Napoléon I
1954: Émile Zola (Short documentary, de Jean Vidal) - Récitant / Narrator (voice)
1955: Milord l'Arsouille (de André Haguet) - Le duc de Mantes
1956: Cela s'appelle l'aurore (de Luis Buñuel) - The Commissioner Fasaro
1957: L'Homme à l'imperméable (de Julien Duvivier) - Le metteur en scène
1957: La Roue (de André Haguet et Maurice Delbez) - Périer
1958: Les Copains du dimanche (de Henri Aisner) - Jean Raymond dit Raf
1958: En cas de malheur (de Claude Autant-Lara) - L'inspecteur
1958: Les Grandes Familles (de Denys de la Patellière) - Le père de Lesquendieu
1958: Vertiges (Short, de J.K et Monique Raymond-Millet)
1960: Le Gigolo (de Jacques Deray) - Le commissaire
1961: Madame Sans-Gêne (de Christian-Jaque) - Napoléon Bonaparte
1961: Vu du ciel (moyen métrage - de Jacques Letellier) - Narrator (voice)
1962: Un chien dans un jeu de quilles (de Fabien Collin)
1963: Fernand Léger (Short, de Tony Saytor et José Cordero) - Narrator (voice)
1963: Douce amère (Short, de Alain Jacquier) - Narrator (voice)
1963: Le Chevalier de Maison-Rouge (TV Mini-Series, de Claude Barma) - Fouquier-Tinville
1965: Le Vrai Mystère de la passion (Documentary, de Louis Dalmas) - Himself
1969: La Voie lactée (de Luis Buñuel) - Richard 'maître d'hôtel' / Maitre d'Hotel
1969: Dieu a choisi Paris (de Gilbert Prouteau et Philippe Arthuys) - Recitant (voice)
1972: Le Charme discret de la bourgeoisie (de Luis Buñuel) - Monsignor Dufour
1974: L'Horloger de Saint-Paul (de Bertrand Tavernier) - Edouard - un ami de Michel
1974: Le Fantôme de la liberté (de Luis Buñuel) - Le premier préfet de police / First Prefect
1974: Verdict (de André Cayatte) - Verlac, l'avocat général
1975: Section spéciale (de Costa-Gavras) - L'avocat général Victor Dupuich, chef du Service central du Parquet
1977: La fille d'Amérique (de David Newman) - M. Duclos
1977: Cet obscur objet du désir (de Luis Buñuel) - Edouard
1977: Julie était belle ou Un été pas comme les autres (de Jacques-René Saurel) - L'homme au fusil
1977: Black out (de Philippe Mordacq - Film resté inédit) - Le mari de la vieille dame
1979: L'Amour en fuite (de François Truffaut) - Monsieur Lucien
1986: Conseil de famille (de Costa-Gavras) - Le propriétaire de la maison fléchettes (final film role)

Television 
1961: Les Parents terribles (de Jean Cocteau, réalisation Jean-Paul Carrère)
1963: Le Chevalier de Maison-Rouge (de Claude Barma)
1964: Le Miroir à trois faces: Werther (de Wolfgang Goethe), émission télévisée d'Aimée Mortimer: Albin Kespner)
1975: ce soir: La Facture (de Françoise Dorin, mise en scène Jacques Charon, réalisation Pierre Sabbagh, Théâtre Édouard VII)

References

External links 
 Julien Berthaud on data.bnf.fr
 

1910 births
1995 deaths
French male stage actors
French theatre directors
People from Algiers
Sociétaires of the Comédie-Française
French male film actors
French male television actors
20th-century French male actors
Migrants from French Algeria to France